Chrysidini is a very large tribe of cuckoo wasps in the subfamily Chrysidinae; this tribe contains more than half of all chrysidid species.

Genera

These genera belong to the tribe Chrysidini:
 Allochrysis Semenov
 Argochrysis Kimsey & Bohart, 1981 g b
 Caenochrysis Kimsey & Bohart, 1981 g b
 Ceratochrysis Cooper, 1952 g b
 Chrysidea Bischoff, 1913 g w
 Chrysis Linnaeus, 1761 i c g b w
 Chrysura Dahlbom, 1845 g b w
 Chrysurissa Bohart, 1980 b
 Euchroeus Latreille, 1809 (= Brugmoia )
 Exochrysis Bohart, 1966 g b
 Gaullea Buysson
 Ipsiura Linsenmaier, 1959
 Neochrysis Linsenmaier, 1959
 Odontochrydium Brauns, 1928 w
 Pentachrysis Lichtenstein, 1876 g
 Pleurochrysis Bohart, 1966
 Praestochrysis Linsenmaier, 1959 g w
 Primeuchroeus Linsenmaier, 1968 g w
 Pseudospinolia Linsenmaier, 1951 g w
 Spinolia Dahlbom, 1854 g
 Spintharina Semenov, 1892 g w
 Spintharosoma Zimmerman, 1959 w
 Stilbichrysis Bischoff, 1910 w
 Stilbum Spinola, 1806 g w
 Trichrysis Lichtenstein, 1876 g w

Data sources: i = ITIS, c = Catalogue of Life, g = GBIF, b = Bugguide.net, w = WaspWeb

References

 Encyclopedia of Life

Hymenoptera tribes
Chrysidinae